Bill Leader (born 26 December 1929) is an English recording engineer and record producer. He is particularly associated with the British folk music revival of the 1960s and 1970s, producing records by Paddy Tunney, Davey Graham, Bert Jansch, John Renbourn, Frank Harte and many others.

Biography
Leader was born in New Jersey, of British parents. His parents returned to the UK while he was still young and he was brought up in Dagenham, Mottingham and Shipley. Even as a child, he wanted to be a recording engineer and he moved back to London in 1955 to work in a film library at the Polish Embassy, with the intention of working in the film industry. He began working for Topic Records and particularly recorded some of the Irish folk musicians who were in London in the late 1950s, as well as releasing a Rambling Jack Elliott record for Topic. To supplement the meagre income from his recording work, he took a job in Collett's record shop (specialising in folk, blues and jazz records) in Oxford Street, London. Through his work in the shop, he met Nathan Joseph who had set up Transatlantic Records and, from 1962, began working with him, part-time, as a producer.

The early days of recording folk artists in England were characterised by low budgets and improvised technology. In the 1960s, Leader lived in Camden and, using a semi-professional Revox tape recorder, recorded a number of artists in his own flat, sound-proofing the room with blankets and egg boxes. John Renbourn described the early recordings of himself and Bert Jansch, in which Leader proceeded by "setting up the tape machine in the sink and having us play in the broom cupboard".

In 1969, together with his second wife, Helen, he set up two record labels: Leader and Trailer Records. The Leader label was intended for recordings like those made by Alan Lomax, with extensive academic liner notes. The Trailer label was focused on the revival scene. A recent compilation of Trailer tracks is Never The Same – Leave-Taking From the British Folk Revival 1970–1977, in which some biographical details are given.

Leader was in charge of the Audio Department at University College Salford.

In 2009, the accompanying book to the Topic Records 70 year anniversary boxed set Three Score and Ten provides Leader's biography. The book lists classic albums, including some engineered or produced by Leader such as Her Mantle So Green (with Ewan MacColl), The Iron Muse and Frost And Fire (both with A.L. Lloyd), and Paddy In The Smoke.

He is now retired and is concentrating on transferring his huge collection of 78, 33 and 45 rpm records onto more modern systems.

Leader was honoured with a "Good Tradition" award, for his contributions to continuing the tradition of folk music, at the 2012 BBC Radio 2 Folk Awards at The Lowry theatre in Salford on 8 February 2012.

Discography
 Woody Guthrie's Blues (1955) – Rambling Jack Elliott
 Her Mantle So Green - Irish Street Songs And Fiddle Tunes (1965) – Margaret Barry & Michael Gorman. [Note: Recorded By – Bill Leader in 1955-1957 (tracks: A1, A3, A6, B1, B3 to B6), Ewan MacColl in 1965 (tracks: A2, A4, A5, B2)]
John Gibbon's Disc (1957) – John Gibbon
Peggy Seeger (1957) – Peggy Seeger
 Nancy Whiskey Sings (1957) – Nancy Whiskey
3/4 A.D. (1962) – Alexis Korner & Davey Graham
The Iron Muse (A Panorama of Industrial Folk Songs) (1963) – compiled by A. L. Lloyd with Anne Briggs, Bob Davenport, Ray Fisher, Louis Killen, Matt McGinn and The Celebrated Working Man's Band
Bert Jansch (1965) – Bert Jansch
A Wild Bees Nest (1965) – Paddy Tunney 
Jack Orion (1966) – Bert Jansch
The Irish Edge (1965) – Paddy Tunney
The Watersons (1966) – The Watersons
The Young Tradition (1966) – The Young Tradition
Ireland Her Own (1965) – Paddy Tunney and Arthur Kearney, with Joe Tunney and Frank Kelly
So Cheerfully Round (1967) – The Young Tradition
Morning Stands On Tiptoe (1967) Dave and Toni Arthur
Mason's Apron (1967) – The Dubliners
Mainly Norfolk (1968) – Peter Bellamy
Matt McGinn (1968) – Matt McGinn
Humble Beginnings: The Complete Transatlantic Recordings, 1969–74 – Billy Connolly
The Humblebums (1969) – The Humblebums
Fair England’s Shore (1969) – Peter Bellamy
The Lark In the Morning (1969) Dave and Toni Arthur with Barry Dransfield
Young Hunting (1970) – Tony Rose
Cruel Sister (1970) – Pentangle
Hearken to the Witches Rune (1970) Dave and Toni Arthur
New Humblebums (1970) – The Humblebums
Mr. Fox (1970) – Mr. Fox
Reflection (1971) – Pentangle
He Came From the Mountains – Bob & Carole Pegg
Rosemary Lane (1971) – Bert Jansch
Tir Na Nóg (1971) – Tír na nÓg
Tear and a Smile (1972) – Tír na nÓg
Prosperous (1972) – Christy Moore
A Lancashire Lad (1972) – Mike Harding
Bright Phoebus (1972) – Mike and Lal Waterson
No More Forever (1972) – Dick Gaughan
The Boys of the Lough (1973) – The Boys of the Lough
Swan Arcade (1973) – Swan Arcade
Tell It Like It Was (1975) – Peter Bellamy
The Barrack Room Ballads of Rudyard Kipling (1976) – Peter Bellamy
Kist O'Gold (1977) – Dick Gaughan
The Noah's Ark Trap (1977) – Nic Jones
Gerry Rafferty (1978) – Gerry Rafferty
From The Devil To A Stranger  (1978) Nic Jones
Oddfellows; The Oddfellows (2011)
Shreds; Ian Reynolds (2012)
That Was Then This Is Now (2013) – Hunter Muskett

Credited as engineer
Jack Takes the Floor (1958) – Ramblin' Jack Elliott
Chorus from the Gallows (1959) – Ewan MacColl
Red Hot from Alex (1964) – Alexis Korner
Bert and John (1966) – Bert Jansch & John Renbourn
Another Monday (1967) – John Renbourn
Sweet Primeroses (1967) – Shirley Collins
Rags, Reels & Airs (1967) – Dave Swarbrick
True Hearted Girl (1977) – The Watersons
Her Mantle So Green – Margaret Barry & Michael Gorman

Other credits
Across the Hills (1964) – Ian Campbell (credited as Supervisor)
Ramblin' Jack Elliott Lost Topic Tapes: Cowes Harbour 1957 – Ramblin' Jack Elliott (credited as Assistant Engineer)
Ramblin' Jack Elliott Lost Topic Tapes: Isle of Wight 1957 – Ramblin' Jack Elliott (credited as Assistant Engineer)

Leader/Trailer labels listing
A full listing of titles on the Leader and Trailer labels is in preparation on Folkopedia

References

English record producers
Academics of the University of Salford
1929 births
Living people

Bibliography
Butler, Mike (2021) Sounding the Century: Bill Leader & Co.: Volume 1 – Glimpses of Far Off Things: 1855-1956